The Scottish Rugby Academy provides Scotland's up and coming rugby stars a dedicated focused routeway for development into the professional game. Entry is restricted to Scottish qualified students and both male and female entrants are accepted into 4 regional academies. The 2020–21 season sees the sixth year of the academy, now sponsored by Fosroc.

Season overview

This was the six year of the Scottish Rugby Academy.

Regional Academies

The Scottish Rugby Academy runs four regional academies in Scotland:- Glasgow and the West, Borders and East Lothian, Edinburgh and Caledonia. These roughly correspond to the traditional districts of Glasgow District, South, Edinburgh District and North and Midlands.

Stages

Players are selected in three stages:-

Supported stages

Stage 1 - Regionally selected and regionally supported players
Stage 2 - Nationally selected and regionally supported players

Contracted stage

Stage 3 - Nationally selected and regionally supported players assigned to a professional team.

Academy Players

Stage 3 players

Stage 3 players are assigned to a professional team. Nominally, for the men, Glasgow Warriors receive the Stage 3 players of Glasgow and the West and Caledonia regions, while Edinburgh Rugby receive the Stage 3 players of the Edinburgh and Borders and East Lothian regions. The women are integrated into the Scotland women's national rugby sevens team and the Scotland women's national rugby union team.

This season, due to the coronavirus pandemic, no Stage 3 players were loaned out to Stade Niçois or to the Super 6 sides.

Instead the Stage 3 players were assigned directly to Glasgow Warriors and Edinburgh Rugby.

Glasgow Warriors

Edinburgh

Stade Niçois

Due to the coronavirus pandemic, no academy players were assigned to Stade Niçois this season.

Super 6 intake

Due to the coronavirus pandemic, the Super 6 competition was suspended for the 2020–21 season. No academy players were assigned to Super 6 sides this season.

Supported players

The inductees for the 2020–21 season are split into their regional academies. The male players are still in Stage 1 and Stage 2 of the academy and not yet deemed professional players. The women named, however, may be international players, using the academy for support.

Borders and East Lothian

 Thomas Jeffrey (Jed-Forest)
 Jamie Gordon (Gala Wanderers)
 Corey Tait (Hawick HS/Youth)
 Marcus Brogan (Hawick HS/Youth)
 Hamish Mollart (Loretto School/Melrose RFC)
 Ben Weir (Earlston HS/Melrose RFC)
 Lochie Milne (Dunbar GS/RFC)
 Sam Derrick (Earlston HS/Melrose RFC)
 Taylor Wilson (Dunbar GS/RFC)
 Finlay Duraj (Loretto School)
 Ben Lynch (Melrose RFC)
 Finlay Thomson (Dunbar GS/RFC)
 Luke Townsend (Earlston HS/Melrose RFC)
 Ben Pickles (Selkirk RFC)
 Roly Brett (Melrose RFC)
 Finlay Douglas (Earlston HS/Melrose RFC)
 Murray Wilson (Gala Academy/Wanderers)
 Elliot Stanger (Hawick HS/Youth)
 Matt Reid (Gala Wanderers)
 Sandy Graham (Dunbar GS/RFC)
 Kieran Clark (Southern Knights)
 Rudi Brown (Earlston HS/Melrose RFC)

Caledonia

 Finlay Burgess (Deeside Rugby)
 Ben Salmon (Dollar Academy)
 Samuel Wallace (Dollar Academy)
 Adam Flynn (Dundee HSFP RFC)
 Moby Ogunlaja (Dundee HSFP RFC)
 Archie Falconer (Ellon Rugby)
 Callum Stephen (Gordonians RFC)
 Jake Spurway (Glenalmond College)
 Harris Mitchell (Mackie Academy FP RFC)
 Andrew McLean (Robert Gordon's College)
 Ross McKnight (Stirling County RFC)
 Mikey Heron (Stirling County Wolves)
 Joe Halliday (Stirling County Wolves)
 Jack Duncan (Stirling County Wolves)
 Andy Stirrat (Strathallan School)
 Callum Beckett (Strathallan School)
 Harris McLeod (Strathallan School)
 Duncan Webb (Strathallan School)
 Callum Norrie (Strathallan School)
 Jonny Morris (Strathallan School)
 Eric Davey (Strathallan School)

Edinburgh

 Fraser McAslan (Edinburgh Accies)
 Duncan Hood (Heriots Blues)
 Gregor Scougall (Currie Chieftains)
 Callum Anderson (Heriots Blues)
 Angus Hoffie (Currie Chieftains)
 Ryan Daley (Currie Chieftains)
 Cameron Scott (Currie Chieftains)
 Michael Jones (Boroughmuir Bears)
 Archie Bogle (Heriots Blues)
 Teddy Thomson (Merchiston Castle School)
 Robert Gordon (Stewarts Melville College)
 Ben Afshar (Merchiston Castle School)
 Matthew Russell (Stewarts Melville College)
 Aidan Boyle (Stewarts Melville College)
 Zack Smith (George Heriots School)
 Daniel King (Stewarts Melville College)
 Ben Evans (Stewarts Melville College)
 Harvey Cameron-Barr (The Edinburgh Academy)
 Michael Cantle (George Watsons College)
 Alex Burns (The Edinburgh Academy)
 Brodie Young (George Watsons College)

Glasgow and the West

 Ali Rodgers (Cumnock)
 Aaron Burgess (Kelvinside Academy)
 Dylan Maxwell (Allan Glens)
 Ewan Brannan (Kelvinside Academy)
 Jamie McEntegart (St Aloysius)
 Theo McKenna (St Aloysius)
 Josh Reed (GHA)
 Ben Skinner (St Columbas)
 Rory Gordon (Dumfries Saints)
 Nairn Calder (Marr)
 Duncan Munn (Kelvinside Academy)
 Jacob Peacock (GHA)
 Calum Ferrie (Kelvinside Academy)
 Euan Muirhead (Dumfries Saints)
 Aiden O'Connor (Ayr)
 Charlie Kennedy (High School of Glasgow)
 George Breese (Stirling County)
 Chris Elliott (Cartha Queens Park)
 Jamie Drummond (Ayrshire Bulls)
 Jamie Campbell (Boroughmuir Bears)
 Trystan Andrews (Glasgow Hawks)
 Cameron Young (Ayr)
 Christian Townsend (Ayrshire Bulls)
 Thomas Glendinning (Glasgow Hawks)
 Jordan Craig (GHA)
 Adam Scott (GHA)

Graduates of this year 

Players who have signed professional contracts with clubs:

  Ross Thompson to  Glasgow Warriors
  Ollie Smith to  Glasgow Warriors
  Tom Lambert to  Glasgow Warriors

References

2020–21
2020–21 in Scottish rugby union